Pavlovsky (Павловский, also spelled as Pavlovskiy) is a Russian-language surname. The Ukrainian-language variant is Павловський, Pavlovskiy. Notable people with the surname include:

Aleksandr Pavlovsky (1936–1977), Soviet Olympic fencer
Andrew Pavlovsky, Russian artist
Yevgeny Pavlovsky (1884-1965), Soviet zoologist
Gleb Pavlovsky, Russian political scientist
Isaac Yakovlevich Pavlovsky (1853-1924), Russian revolutionary
 (1942-2004), Ukrainian scientist and politician
Volodymyr Pavlovskiy, Ukrainian rower

Russian-language surnames